Tiberius Claudius Cogidubnus (or Togidubnus, Togidumnus or similar; see naming difficulties) was a 1st-century king of the Regni or Regnenses tribe in early Roman Britain.

Chichester and the nearby Roman villa at Fishbourne, believed by some to have been Cogidubnus' palace, were probably part of the territory of the Atrebates tribe before the Roman conquest of Britain in AD 43. Cogidubnus may therefore have been an heir of Verica, the Atrebatic king whose overthrow prompted the emperor Claudius to invade. After the conquest the area formed part of the civitas of the Regnenses / Regni, possibly Cogidubnus' kingdom before being incorporated into the Roman province. The public baths, amphitheatre and forum in Silchester were probably built in Cogidubnus' time.

Sources
In Tacitus's Agricola, published  98, where his name appears as "Cogidumnus" in most manuscripts although they can be considered as copies, and "Togidumnus" in one, he is said to have governed several civitates (states or tribal territories) as a client ruler after the Roman conquest, and to have been loyal "down to our own times" (at least into the 70s).

He is also known from an inscription on a damaged slab of marble found in Chichester in 1723 and datable to the late 1st century. As reconstructed by J.E. Bogaers, it reads (reconstructed parts in square brackets):

[N]EPTVNO·ET·MIN[ER]VAE
TEMPLVM
[PR]O·SALVTE·DO[MVS]·DIVINA[E]
[EX]·AVCTORITAT[E·TI]·CLAVD·
[CO]GIDVBNI·R[EG·MA]GNI·BRIT·
[COLE]GIVM·FABROR·ET[·Q]VI·IN·E[O]
[SVNT]·D·S·D·DONANTE·AREAM

Which translates as:

Another fragmentary inscription, reading [...]GIDVBNVS, was found at the Gallo-Roman town of Mediolanum Santonum (modern Saintes, south-west France), although it is unlikely this refers to the same person.

Naming difficulties
In the Chichester inscription, the first two letters of the king's native name, given in the genitive case, are missing. It is usually reconstructed as "Cogidubnus", following the majority of manuscripts of Tacitus, but some, including Charles E Murgia, believe "Togidubnus" is the more linguistically correct form as a Celtic name. The Roman names "Tiberius Claudius" indicate that he was given Roman citizenship by the emperor Claudius, or possibly by Nero, and probably not, as has been suggested, that he was related to Claudia Rufina, a woman of British descent whose marriage to Aulus Pudens in Rome in the 90s is mentioned by the poet Martial.

He is nearly contemporary with Togodumnus, a prince of the Catuvellauni tribe mentioned by Dio Cassius, and the similarity of their names has led some, including Dr Miles Russell of Bournemouth University and the distinguished archaeologist professor Barry Cunliffe of Oxford University, to suggest that they may be one and the same, thereby making the Fishbourne king a son of Cunobelinus and brother of Caratacus. However the sources do not appear to support this: according to Dio, Togodumnus was killed in 43 in the early stages of the Roman conquest of Britain, while Tacitus says that Cogidubnus remained loyal to Rome as a client king into the later part of the 1st century. It is of course not unusual for two people to have similar names (cf. Dubnovellaunus). As the Chichester inscription supports Tacitus, Cunliffe's interpretation would appear to imply an error in Dio's Roman History or in its transmission, and some, including John Hind, have argued that Dio misinterpreted his sources as reading that Togodumnus had died when he had merely been defeated.

Villa at Fishbourne
Barry Cunliffe (the archaeologist who uncovered Fishbourne) has put forward the theory that Fishbourne Roman Palace was Cogidubnus's royal seat. Certainly the early phase of the palace, which dates to around AD 65, could have belonged to him or to one Tiberius Claudius Catuarus, whose inscribed gold ring was found in excavations close by. Miles Russell, however, has suggested that, as the main constructional phase of the palace proper at Fishbourne seems to have been in the early AD 90s, during the reign of the emperor Domitian who built the Domus Flavia, a palace of similar design upon the Palatine Hill in Rome, Fishbourne may instead have been built for Sallustius Lucullus, a Roman governor of Britain of the late 1st century. Lucullus may have been the son of the British prince Adminius.<ref>Norman Hammond, "Whose busts are they?", The Times, 31 July 2006, retrieved 31 August 2006; Miles Russell (2010) Bloodline: The Celtic Kings of Roman Britain p 161-177</ref>

In fiction
Tiberius Claudius Cogidubnus appears in the Cambridge Latin Course Books II and III, and lives in the Palace of Fishbourne mentioned above. He falls ill during the book and moves to Bath as he believes the sacred baths can cure him of his illness, but he meets Salvius. In the books, he is in the middle of a conspiracy against his life, headed by the wicked Salvius and the Emperor Domitian. He dies under house arrest in the spring of 83, after being ill for some time, and his will is recreated by Salvius in order to give himself the Palace of Fishbourne.

He is also the central character in Mark Patton's novel, An Accidental King, and a minor character in Douglas Jackson's novel, Claudius.

He is the father of the central characters of They of RomeHe is a minor character in Lindsey Davis's novels, A Body in the Bath House. and The Jupiter Myth.

He is the first person protagonist in Linda Proud's novel, Chariot of the Soul,  in which he describes his education in Rome, studying Stoicism with Seneca, and his return to Britain charged with the mission of persuading the tribal kings not to resist the invasion of the Romans.

He is mentioned in Ben Aaronovitch's novel Broken Homes, where he is one of the "Rivers of London".

Sources
 Roger Gale (1722), "An Account of a Roman Inscription, Found at Chichester", Philosophical Transactions (1683–1775) Vol. 32 (1722), pp. 391–400
 Anthony A Barrett (1979), "The Career of Tiberius Claudius Cogidubnus", Britannia 10, pp. 227–242
 J. E. Bogaers (1979), "King Cogidubnus in Chichester: Another Reading of 'RIB' 91", Britannia 10, pp. 243–254
 Peter A. Clayton (ed) (1980), A Companion to Roman Britain Sheppard Frere (1987), Britannia: a history of Roman Britain (3rd edition)
 Martin Henig, "Togidubnus and the Roman liberation", British Archaeology, no 37, September 1998.
 Martin Henig (2002, 2012), The Heirs of King Verica, Culture and Politics in Roman Britain Miles Russell (2006) Roman Britain's Lost Governor, Current Archaeology, no 204.
 Miles Russell (2006) Roman Sussex.
 Miles Russell (2010) Bloodline: The Celtic Kings of Roman Britain''.

References

External links
Regnenses at Roman-Britain.co.uk

1st-century births
Year of death unknown
Briton rulers
1st-century monarchs in Europe
1st-century Romans
Cogidubnus, Tiberius